Omadhoo (Dhivehi: އޮމަދޫ) is one of the inhabited islands of Alif Dhaal Atoll in the Maldives.

Geography

Demography

According to the latest census conducted in 2018, the total population of Omadhoo is at 1089 out of which 840 are Maldivians, and above 150 foreigners.

Governance
In accordance with the recently passed Decentralization Act of Maldives, Omadhoo is governed by an elected Island Council composed of Three Councillors. The council is headed by the President of the council. The Island Council reports to the Local Government Authority (LGA).

Economy 
As of January 2018 there are nine guest house in Omadhoo. The guest houses provide the island with direct employment, and many other indirect economic benefits to the island. Most guest houses are funded by direct investments by local residents of the island. However, recently there have been investments by businessmen in Male' and elsewhere.

Guest houses provide various excursions, including: whale shark watching, manta rays, off island snorkeling, fishing, scuba diving, sand bank and picnic island visiting (including overnight staying).

Education
Omadhoo is served by combined one preschool and one primary/secondary school, Omadhoo School.

Transport 
Omadhoo is connected by ferry service from Malé. Some private companies provide scheduled speedboat service.

References

Islands of the Maldives